Washakie County School District #2 is a public school district based in Ten Sleep, Wyoming, United States. With an enrollment of just 94 students (as of October 1, 2008), it is the smallest school district in the state of Wyoming.

Geography
Washakie County School District #2 serves the eastern portion of Washakie County. The town of Ten Sleep is the only incorporated place in the district.

Schools
Ten Sleep School (Grades K-12)

Student demographics
The following figures are as of October 1, 2008.

Total District Enrollment:
Student enrollment by gender
Male: 
Female:
Student enrollment by ethnicity
White:
Hispanic:
Black: 
Asian or Pacific Islander:

See also
List of school districts in Wyoming

References

External links
Washakie County School District #2 – official site.

Education in Washakie County, Wyoming
School districts in Wyoming